Egdon is a hamlet located in the county of Worcestershire and falls with the civil parish of Stoulton.

Hamlets in Worcestershire
Wychavon